"An American Symphony (Mr. Holland's Opus)" is the title track for the finale symphonic piece played at the end of the 1995 film Mr. Holland's Opus. It was written by American born composer Michael Kamen, and it won the 1997 Grammy for Best Instrumental Arrangement.

The lead character "Mr. Holland" can be seen working on the piece (at the piano and on scraps of sheet music) throughout the film. And, at the end of the film, the music comes to represent Holland's "opus"--as the many generations of students that he influenced come together to play his symphony for him--during the film's resolution.

The score was recorded by the London Metropolitan Orchestra for the film.

Instrumentation
The score calls for two flutes, one oboe, one English horn, two clarinets in B-flat, one bass clarinet in B-flat, two bassoons, one contrabassoon; six horns in F, three trumpets in B-flat, three tenor trombones, one bass trombone, one tuba; a percussion section with timpani, drum kit, suspended cymbal, bass drum, cymbals, tam-tam, glockenspiel and wind chimes; one electric guitar and one bass guitar; one piano; one harp and strings.

Arrangement
The arrangement is unique in that it features many instrumental voicing that are not typical of traditional classical music, but rather, are more typical of contemporary American rock. For example, the song includes: a full rock drum kit, an electric bass guitar, and an electric guitar. 

The song also features several tones that are only made possible by contemporary instruments, such as the left-handed glissando ("slide") on the electric bass guitar, the distortion pedals used on the electric guitar, and the introductory drum fill that begins the song’s major movement. 

Additionally, the piece features a driving rhythm throughout, and is rarely without percussion. All of these characteristics are hallmarks of American Rock, and help to emphasize that the piece should be perceived as an "American" work--just as the title portrays.

Film scores